Tingo may refer to:

Tinku, a word in the Quechua language which means "union, meeting"
People's name and/or surname.
Places in Peru:
Tingo, a village near the city of Arequipa. It's divided in two parts:
Tingo Grande
Tingo Chico
Tingo Balneary, a balneary within the referred town.
Tingo District, a district within the Luya Province, in the Amazonas Department.
Tingo river, a river which runs through the Luya Province in Amazonas.
Tingo María, a village in the Huanuco Department.